Lodewijk Count van Bylandt  (Keken, 1718 – Hoeven, 28 December 1793) was a Dutch lieutenant-admiral. He gained a certain notoriety in the Affair of Fielding and Bylandt of 1779 and even more in consequence of the refusal of the Dutch navy to put out to sea to combine with the French fleet in Brest in 1783, during the Fourth Anglo-Dutch War, for which refusal many held him responsible. He was court-martialed and exonerated in the first case, and in the second case an inquiry into his conduct was long delayed and eventually quietly abandoned after stadtholder William V had prevailed against the Patriots in 1787. This made his promotion to lieutenant-admiral (the highest rank in the Dutch navy, as that of General Admiral could only be held by the stadtholder) possible. He died in office as inspector-general and commander of the gunners corps of the navy of the Dutch Republic.

Family life
Van Bylandt was the son of Ludwig Roeleman, Imperial Count of Bylandt-Halt (a cadet branch of the House of Bylandt), a Prussian high official, and Christina Maria Louisa Freiin (baroness) von Heyden - Broeck. He never married. He was a relative of several other high officers in the army and navy of the Dutch Republic and Kingdom of the Netherlands, among whom Willem Frederik van Bylandt, who commanded a brigade at the Battle of Waterloo.

Career
Van Bylandt entered the Dutch navy as an adelborst (midshipman) in 1736 in which year he sailed on a cruise to Curaçao. He attained the rank of captain in 1747. In 1756 he was captain of West Stellingwerff and in 1768 of Thetis with which he took part in expeditions against the Barbary corsairs in those years. In 1775 Van Bylandt was acting-commander of a Dutch naval expedition (with the rank of rear-admiral) against Morocco. This expedition was successful in its object to force Sultan Mohammed ben Abdallah to sue for peace.

After the start of the American Revolution Dutch merchants became heavily involved in trade with the new American Republic. The Dutch West India Company had an entrepôt in its colony of St. Eustatius where American merchants came to trade in colonial wares like tobacco and indigo (which had hitherto been prohibited to them under the British Navigation Acts). Dutch and French merchants imported guns and munitions, and also naval stores to St. Eustatius, which were then re-exported to the rebellious American colonies. The British considered such trade "illegal" and tried to hinder it by enforcing a trade embargo with the help of British privateers, which were an encumbrance to American merchantmen that visited the island, and also to Dutch, French and other neutral shipping (France was at this time not yet at war with Great Britain). To suppress this privateer activity the Dutch government sent a Dutch naval squadron under Van Bylandt to the West Indies. He remained there a year and was successful in keeping the privateers at bay. (Note that at this time the Dutch Republic was still neutral and was just defending its rights as such).

After France and Spain became involved in the War of the American Revolution in 1778 Dutch merchants also were heavily involved in trade with these belligerents in goods that the British considered contraband, but that fell outside the narrow definition of that concept in the Anglo-Dutch Commercial Treaty of 1668. This treaty guaranteed Dutch shipping a privileged status and exempted it from trade embargoes enforced by the British Royal Navy as far as non-contraband goods were concerned. A diplomatic conflict between Great Britain now ensued about the interpretation of this treaty and of the definition of "contraband" under it. The British tried to declare naval stores, like ship's timbers, spars, masts, rope, tar and pitch "contraband," against which the Dutch maintained the narrow definition of the treaty as only "arms and munitions." The trade in naval stores was important to France, as her naval construction depended on it. France therefore strongly opposed the tendency of the pro-British Dutch government of stadtholder William V to give in to the British demands and insisted on the Dutch "defending their treaty rights" to the point of selectively using economic sanctions against Dutch cities that supported the stadtholder's policy on this point. In November 1779 the States-General of the Netherlands therefore directed the stadtholder (as commander-in-chief of the Dutch navy) to offer limited convoy to Dutch merchants. This was a compromise, as it still excluded protection of merchantmen transporting naval stores to belligerents, but it was hoped that other, even more innocent Dutch vessels could be protected from the harassment of the Royal Navy and British privateers in this way.

One of the first convoys, escorted by five Dutch warships under command of Van Bylandt, departed from the Texel in December 1779, and was intercepted by a far stronger British squadron near the Isle of Wight on 30 December 1779. This led to the celebrated Affair of Fielding and Bylandt in which Bylandt was forced to strike his colors after firing just one broadside. This humiliation caused a furore in the Dutch Republic in which the stadtholder was also attacked. Van Bylandt demanded a special court-martial to clear his name of accusations of cowardice and treason, and he was acquitted.

After the Affair the relations between the Republic and Great Britain steadily deteriorated, and the latter started the Fourth Anglo-Dutch War in December 1780. The Dutch colonies in the West Indies were immediately attacked and Great Britain soon captured St. Eustatius that was subsequently devastated by admiral Rodney. According to his biographer Molhuysen Van Bylandt was also sent to the area and he successfully organized the defense of Curaçao, which remained in Dutch hands. However, other sources, notably Dirks, tell us that Bylandt was never directly involved in the defense of Curaçao, but only detached a ship of the squadron with which he was staying in Lisbon at the time for that purpose.

After his return to the Netherlands in 1781 he was promoted to vice-admiral and ordered to contest the British blockade of the Dutch coast. He found the state of the Dutch fleet so deplorable, however, that nothing came of this. As the stadtholder resisted a formal alliance with the French there was little cooperation between the Dutch, and the French and Spanish armed forces in the common war with Great Britain, which the Republic conducted as if it were alone. The French strongly favored informal cooperation in specific projects, however, and the stadtholder was not always able to prevent those. One of these projects was the combination of the French and Dutch fleets at Brest in late 1782 (when the main British fleet had sailed to Spain to defend Gibraltar), with the objective of either harassing the British coast, or attacking the British West-Indies fleet of admiral Rodney that was expected to return around this time. After long dithering the Dutch decided to provide ten ships of the line for such a project, and Van Bylandt was put in charge of this squadron. When he had inspected the ships he refused point-blank to sail in them, however, as he considered their state of readiness insufficient. In this refusal he was supported by the other Dutch commanders. The Dutch government was therefore forced to admit to the French that it was unable to provide the promised naval support.

This again caused a furor in the Republic and public opinion also held the stadtholder responsible for the fiasco, though he for once had supported the expedition. The States of Holland demanded a public inquiry and the commission that conducted that inquiry recommended prosecution of the officers involved, especially Van Bylandt. This time a court-martial was not deemed to be sufficient, but the case was taken up by a special judicial commission of the States-General at the end of 1783. The trial only started in 1785 (after the war had already ended) and was dragged out by his friends. Meanwhile, the revolt of the Patriots took its course and the military intervention of the Prussians and British in 1787, that ended that revolt, also enabled the stadtholder to quietly end the inquiry.

Van Bylandt had never lost the favor of the stadtholder and the latter was now able to promote him to lieutenant-admiral. He was given the prestigious function of inspector-general of the corps of naval gunners. He died in 1793, still in office.

During his career he made great contributions to codification of naval tactics with his Zeetactiek of Grondregelen der krijgskunde ter zee ("Naval tactics or Fundamentals of military science at sea;" Amsterdam, 1767) and he is also credited with restoring discipline in the fleet, which apparently had reached a low level at some point.

Notes

Sources
 (1871) De Nederlandsche Zeemagt in Hare verschillende Tijdperken Geschetst. Deel 3
 "Bylandt, Lodewijk van," in:  (1918) Nieuw Nederlandsch Biografisch Woordenboek. Deel 4, pp. 383–386 
 (2001; repr. 1911 ed.) The Dutch Republic and The American Revolution. University Press of the Pacific, 

1718 births
1793 deaths
18th-century Dutch people
Counts of the Netherlands
Admirals of the navy of the Dutch Republic
People of the Patriottentijd
People acquitted of treason
People from Kleve
18th-century Dutch military personnel
Dutch military personnel of the War of the Austrian Succession